Július Szöke (born 1 August 1995) is a Slovak football midfielder who plays for Aris Limassol.

Club career

MFK Ružomberok
Szöke made his Fortuna Liga debut for Ružomberok against MŠK Žilina on 22 March 2014.

International career
Szöke, then-aged 26, was first recognised in a senior national team nomination on 16 March 2022 by Štefan Tarkovič as an alternate ahead of two international friendly fixtures against Norway and Finland.

Honours
Shakhtyor Soligorsk
Belarusian Premier League (1): 2020
Belarusian Cup (1): 2018–19

References

External links
 
 Eurofotbal profile
 Corgoň Liga profile
 ŽP Šport Podbrezová profile

1995 births
Living people
People from Hnúšťa
Sportspeople from the Banská Bystrica Region
Slovak footballers
Slovakia under-21 international footballers
Slovakia youth international footballers
Association football midfielders
FK Železiarne Podbrezová players
2. Liga (Slovakia) players
MFK Ružomberok players
FC ViOn Zlaté Moravce players
FC Shakhter Karagandy players
FC Shakhtyor Soligorsk players
Hapoel Ironi Kiryat Shmona F.C. players
Aris Limassol FC players
Slovak Super Liga players
Kazakhstan Premier League players
Belarusian Premier League players
Israeli Premier League players
Cypriot First Division players
Slovak expatriate footballers
Expatriate footballers in Kazakhstan
Expatriate footballers in Belarus
Expatriate footballers in Israel
Expatriate footballers in Cyprus
Slovak expatriate sportspeople in Kazakhstan
Slovak expatriate sportspeople in Belarus
Slovak expatriate sportspeople in Israel
Slovak expatriate sportspeople in Cyprus